Mood tracking is a positive psychology technique for improving mental health where a person records their mood, usually at set time intervals, in order to help identify patterns in how their mood varies. It has been suggested as a self-help method for people suffering from mood disorders such as anxiety, clinical depression, and bipolar disorder.

The recording of moods can be carried out within smartphone apps,.

Some other formats include:
 Mood charts.
 Journals.

References

Positive psychology
Treatment of mental disorders